The 2008 Karnataka Legislative Assembly election took place in three phases on 10, 16 and 22 May 2008 in all the 224 assembly constituencies in Karnataka, India. The elections were conducted to elect a Government in the state of Karnataka for the next five years. The votes were counted on 25 May and due to the use of electronic voting machines, all the results were out by the afternoon itself. The Bharatiya Janata Party emerged victorious winning 110 seats. Although the party fell short of a clear majority, it was able to form the government with the support of 6 independents. This was the first time BJP came to power on its own in Karnataka and any south Indian state.

Background
In the 2004 Karnataka elections, the BJP emerged as the single largest party winning 79 out of the 224 seats. However, the Indian National Congress with 65 members and the Janata Dal (Secular) with 58 members formed a coalition government with Dharam Singh of the Congress as Chief minister. However, in early 2006, the JD(S) withdrew its support to the government and instead formed an alliance with the BJP and H. D. Kumaraswamy of the JD(S) became Chief minister. The arrangement was based on an agreement that Kumaraswamy would be the Chief Minister for the first 20 months and B.S. Yeddyurappa of the BJP would be Chief Minister for the next 20 months.

The alliance between the BJP and the JD(S) collapsed in October 2007 after Kumaraswamy refused to let Yeddyurappa take over as Chief minister as had been agreed upon in 2006. They briefly got together and formed a short-lived government headed by Yeddyurappa in November 2007 but it quickly collapsed due to disagreements over power-sharing. As a result, the state came under the president's rule and new elections were called for.

Schedule 

The Election Commission of India announced that polling would be held in a three phases on 10th, 16th and 22 May and that results would be declared on 25 May.

It also declared that the provisions of the Model Code of Conduct "came into force with immediate effect" with the said announcement.

Campaign
The state was the first in India to vote after the electoral constituencies had been redrawn based on new population data. The BJP campaigned on the high rate of inflation and criticized the national United Progressive Alliance government for being soft on terrorism. The party called on the voters to give the party a chance in Karnataka.

But the main election plank of the party was the betrayal of the JD (S) and the good budgets presented by Yeddyurappa when he was finance minister in the coalition government. The Congress party pledged to reign in prices, improve the infrastructure of the state, and provide a stable government.

Results

Results by Constituency 
Source:

Sources: Election Commission of India, Times of India, News 18, News Minute

Aftermath
Although the BJP fell 3 seats short of getting an absolute majority, B. S. Yeddyurappa was able to become chief minister with the support of 6 independent members of the assembly. He was sworn in as Chief minister on 30 May 2008 along with a 30 strong Cabinet, which included 5 of the 6 independents who had agreed to back the BJP. Jagadish Shettar was elected speaker on 5 June and a vote of confidence was passed by voice vote on 6 June after the opposition walked out.

References

External links
Karnataka constituency results 

2008 State Assembly elections in India
State Assembly elections in Karnataka
2000s in Karnataka